Endings is the second feature film written and directed by Chris Hansen, a professor of film and digital media at Baylor University and the director of the film program.  It was shot locally in Waco, Texas, United States in June 2008, using Baylor film students as a large part of the crew.  Postproduction occurred until April 2010.  It had its world premiere at the Seattle's True Independent Film Festival in June 2010.

Synopsis
A strung-out drug addict, Chris Ryan, holds his knife to a little girl’s throat (Emmy Ferguson) while the other patrons look on in horror.

Emmy Ferguson, a ten-year-old at home with her father, Charlie, who is medicating her for leukemia.  She overhears a doctor telling him that  she probably won’t live to see another day.  Charlie clearly loves her and protects her as if it’s his only purpose in life, and he goes into a panic a little later when he finds Emmy missing from her room. 
 
Adonna Frost, trying to get her family ready for the day.  As they finally leave, she faints dead away.

Adonna’s doctor explains that her cancer is now advanced and that she should have been getting treatment.

After Chris steals from his mother to get drug money – and allows his friend to assault her – he is kidnapped by a group calling themselves the Death Prevention Squad. Chris, Adonna, and Emmy make another stop - for him to get drugs (only after Emmy coaxes Adonna to agree).  Chris has to convince the dealer that he is for real, and he references Jamie, who told him about this dealer.  The drug dealer provides him with what he wants and mentions that Jamie is coming over later.  Chris is heartbroken and tries to buy off the dealer to get him not to sell drugs to Jamie  Back in the car, Emmy wants to know how to take the drugs, so Chris (to Adonna's chagrin) demonstrates.

The police find Charlie at his ex-wife's place.  They take him away for questioning and interview her.  She tells them she was just Emmy's stepmom and that Emmy's real mom left the family years ago.

After stopping by a roadside carnival and a bridge at night, the three travelers make their way to their destination - which turns out to be a cemetery.  Emmy's mom is dead and she wanted to visit her grave.

The sun has risen, and Chris and Adonna must decide what to do.  Chris tells her he will call the police and stay with Emmy's body to explain.  He tells her to go home to her family.

Cast
 Emma Hansen as Emmy Ferguson
 Ellen Dolan as Adonna Frost
 Matthew Brumlow as Chris Ryan
 Joseph Frost as Charlie Ferguson

Screenings
 Seattle's True Independent Film Festival 2010
 Atlanta Underground Film Festival 2010 (Best Director award)
 Southern Winds Film Festival 2010 (Best Dramatic Feature/”A Seriously Good Movie – Feature” Award)
 Dallas VideoFest 2010
 Secret City Film Festival 2010
 Trail Dance Film Festival 2011 (Best Screenplay, Chris Hansen)
 ReelHeART International Film Festival 2011
 Myrtle Beach International Film Festival 2011

Awards
 Best Director (Atlanta Underground Film Festival 2010)
 Best Dramatic Feature/”A Seriously Good Movie – Feature” Award (Southern Winds Film Festival 2010)
 Best Screenplay, Chris Hansen (Trail Dance Film Festival 2011; also nominated for Best Feature Drama and Best Actor/Actress in a Feature, Emma Hansen)

External links

http://festivalleague.com/endings.cfm
http://southernwindsfilmfestival.com/blog/2010/08/06/endings/
http://www.thestranger.com/seattle/Venues/Stiff?film=3978098
https://web.archive.org/web/20110718025652/http://www.videofest.org/23-0050-NARF
https://web.archive.org/web/20120313163711/http://www.secretcityfilmfest.com/schedule.php
http://www.traildancefilmfestival.com/films-extended.asp?ID=11-0109-TD
http://www.baylor.edu/kwbu/news.php?action=story&story=76377
http://www.baylor.edu/kwbu/news.php?action=story&story=76404a
KillingBoxx (Will Colby): https://web.archive.org/web/20100814204647/http://www.killingboxx.com/content.php?section=BoxxOffice&cID=Endings
Underground Film Journal (Mike Everleth): http://www.undergroundfilmjournal.com/movie-review-endings/

2010 films
American independent films
Films about drugs
2010s English-language films
2010s American films